The Five-storied pagoda of Ryongtongsa Buddhist temple is listed as a National Treasure of North Korea.

The pagoda is 6.48 m high, built with "well-trimmed granite stones" on a platform with a width of 3.23 m. Dating from the Koryo Dynasty, it is located 10 km north of Kaesong. The KCNA describes it as representative of "the high architecture in the early days of the Koryo Dynasty."

References 

Korean pagodas
Stone pagodas
National Treasures of North Korea
Pagodas in North Korea
Buildings and structures in North Hwanghae Province